Barnaby Furnas, (born Philadelphia, Pennsylvania 1973), is an American painter and former graffiti artist who lives and works in New York City. He studied at the School of Visual Arts in New York and received a BFA in 1995 before going on to study at Columbia University in New York, receiving an MFA in 2000. He makes his own paint from pigment mixed with urethane.

Exhibitions
Furnas’s work has been exhibited widely internationally at galleries and museums such as the Baltic Centre for Contemporary Art in Gateshead in the UK, Kunsthalle Wien in Austria, Museum of Contemporary Art, Chicago, Museo d'Arte Moderna di Bologna, The Whitney Museum of American Art in New York, and The Royal Academy in London. He is represented by Marianne Boesky Gallery in New York and Victoria Miro Gallery in London.

External links
The Saatchi Gallery Information on Barnaby Furnas including artworks, text panels, articles, and full biography
Artforum review, November, 2003.

1973 births
Living people
Artists from Philadelphia
20th-century American painters
American male painters
21st-century American painters
21st-century American male artists
School of Visual Arts alumni
Columbia University School of the Arts alumni
20th-century American male artists